Honeycomb Glacier is a glacier which drains the north and east sides of the mountainous mass surmounted by Mount Whewell, then flows south between that feature and Honeycomb Ridge to Moubray Bay, on the coast of Antarctica. It was named by the New Zealand Geological Survey Antarctic Expedition, 1957–58, for its proximity to Honeycomb Ridge.

References

Glaciers of Victoria Land
Borchgrevink Coast